Henry FitzRoy, 5th Duke of Grafton (10 February 1790 – 26 March 1863), styled Viscount Ipswich until 1811 and Earl of Euston between 1811 and 1844, was a British peer and politician.

Grafton was the son of George FitzRoy, 4th Duke of Grafton and Lady Charlotte Maria Waldegrave, daughter of James Waldegrave, 2nd Earl Waldegrave. The 6th Duke was a politician.

He represented Bury St Edmunds as member of parliament as a Whig between 1818 and 1820 and again between 1826 and 1831, and was member for Thetford between 1834 and 1841.

On 24 May 1830, he was commissioned colonel of the West Suffolk Militia.

Grafton married Mary Caroline Berkeley (18 June 1795 – 10 September 1873, the daughter of Admiral the Hon. Sir George Cranfield Berkeley), on 20 June 1812 in Portugal. They had five children:

 Lady Mary Elizabeth Emily Fitzroy (1817–1887), married Reverend Hon. Augustus Phipps, the son of The Earl of Mulgrave
 Maria Louisa Fitzroy (1818–1912), married Edward Douglas-Pennant, 1st Baron Penrhyn and had issue.
William Henry FitzRoy, 6th Duke of Grafton (1819–1882)
Augustus Charles Lennox FitzRoy, 7th Duke of Grafton (1821–1918)
 Frederick John Fitzroy (1823–1919), married Catherine Wescomb and had issue.

Grafton died in 1863, aged seventy-three, at Wakefield Lodge, near Potterspury, Northamptonshire.

References

External links 
 

1790 births
1863 deaths
British Militia officers
105
Earls of Arlington
Henry
Members of the Parliament of the United Kingdom for English constituencies
UK MPs 1818–1820
UK MPs 1826–1830
UK MPs 1830–1831
UK MPs 1832–1835
UK MPs 1835–1837
UK MPs 1837–1841
UK MPs who inherited peerages
H